Spontaneous may refer to:
 Spontaneous abortion
 Spontaneous bacterial peritonitis
 Spontaneous combustion
 Spontaneous declaration
 Spontaneous emission
 Spontaneous fission
 Spontaneous generation
 Spontaneous human combustion
 Spontaneous Music Ensemble
 Spontaneous order
 Spontaneous process
 Spontaneous remission
 Spontaneous symmetry breaking
 Spontaneous (album) by William Parker & the Little Huey Creative Music Orchestra
 Spontaneous (film), an American sci-fi fantasy film

See also 
 Revolutionary spontaneity, also known as spontaneism, the belief that social revolution can and should occur spontaneously without the aid or guidance of a vanguard party.